Bibinje is a village and a municipality in southern Croatia, situated southeast from Zadar, between the Adriatic tourist road and the sea, having a four-kilometer coastline with beaches and pathways. According to the 2011 census, it has 3,985 residents, 97% of which are Croats.

The name Bibano or Bibanium dates as far back as the 11th century. The population always depended on agriculture and cattle breeding, followed by the fishing trade in more recent times.

Tourism

Tourism dates back to the middle of the 20th century. There is a marina in the Bibinje area called Dalmacija, with various facilities. Its area is about 70,000 m2, and it is the largest Adriatic marina with 1,400 berths.

Visitors are greeted by their hosts and welcome to rent rooms and apartments  with accommodation for approximately 2,500 guests in 800 registered rooms and apartments. There are several camps to choose from, all of them situated a few meters from the sea. Local restaurants offer special dishes of the region, there are cafes, small shops, a self-service shop in the center, a repair shop for vehicles and boat engines. There is a post office with money exchange office, a kindergarten, a general practice clinic, a dentist's office, and a drugstore.

One can always get all the necessary information in the Bibinje tourist office concerning accommodation or entertainment. There is a very interesting ethnographic collection in the town museum, and sacral 15th century exhibits in the John the Baptist's Church. There are five Catholic churches in Bibinje.

The village is home to a monument to the first Croatian president Franjo Tuđman and a memorial entitled Greeting to the Sea.

The tourists are known for their monthly Marathon Mondays, wherein participants can only drink alcoholic beverages over a twenty-three hour period, from sunrise to sunrise. During peak season, sunrise starts early, much to the chagrin of locals. By completing the challenge, people feel a great deal of accomplishment and pride. Tourists tend to join their spiritual tradition, but the majority fails tremendously. When participants fail the laborious challenge, they are dunked into the sea by fellow drinkers.

References

External links

 
 Tourist office Bibinje

Municipalities of Croatia
Populated places in Zadar County